Glenn Emery "Press" Presnell (July 28, 1905 – September 13, 2004) was an American football player, coach, and college athletics administrator.  He set the NFL single-season scoring record in 1933 and led the league in total offense.  He was the last surviving member of the Detroit Lions inaugural 1934 team and helped lead the team to its first NFL championship in 1935.  He also set an NFL record with a 54-yard field goal in 1934, a record which was not broken for 19 years.  Presnell served as the head football coach at the University of Nebraska–Lincoln in 1942 and at  Eastern Kentucky State College—now known as Eastern Kentucky University–from 1954 to 1963, compiling a career college football coaching record of 45–56–3.  He was also the athletic director at Eastern Kentucky from 1963 to 1971.

Early years
Born in Gilead, Nebraska, Presnell attended DeWitt High School and the University of Nebraska–Lincoln.  He played college football as a halfback for the Nebraska Cornhuskers football team from 1925 to 1927.  In 1925, Presnell led Nebraska to a 14–0 victory over an Illini team that included the "Galloping Ghost", Red Grange.  As one writer put it, "all the galloping was done by Presnell this day."  Presnell was selected as a first-team player on the 1927 College Football All-America Team.

Professional football
After leaving Nebraska, Presnell played football for the Ironton Tanks in Ironton, Ohio.  He was a player-coach for the team and also taught science at Ironton High School.  Presnell was a halfback in Ironton's single wing offense and also played on defense at what would later be considered the safety position.  Although not officially part of the National Football League, the Tanks played against teams in the league.  In 1930, Presnell led Ironton to victories over both the New York Giants and the Chicago Bears.  Against the Giants, the Tanks trailed 12-6 with three seconds left.  Presnell threw a touchdown pass to Gene Alford and then kicked the extra point to give Ironton a 13–12 victory over a Giants team that finished in second place in the NFL.  He also scored two touchdowns against the Bears, including an 88-yard run.

After the 1930 season, the Tanks folded.  In 1931, Presnell joined the Portsmouth Spartans in the NFL. He had his best season in 1933, when he led the NFL in total offense with  1,296 yards.  He also broke the single-season NFL scoring record with 64 points.  (Ken Strong tied with Presnell with the same point total in 1933.)  During the 1933 NFL season, Presnell completed 50 of 125 passes for 774 passing yards and added 522 rushing yards on 118 carries for an average of 4.4 yards per carry.  He also kicked five field goals and 13 extra points. He led the NFL with six rushing touchdowns and 13 successful extra point conversions.  He also finished second in the league (behind Harry Newman) in passing touchdowns, passes completed, pass attempts, and passing yards.  Following the 1933 season, Presnell was selected as a first-team All-NFL player by the NFL, the United Press, and Collyers Eye Magazine.

In 1934, the owner of the Portsmouth Spartans sold the team. The team was moved from Portsmouth, Ohio to Detroit, Michigan, and became the Detroit Lions.  When Presnell visited Detroit to sign his first contract with the Lions in 1934, team owner George A. Richards allowed Presnell to pick the team's colors. Presnell later recalled:"Mr. Richards, the owner, the day I was up there and signed my contract, he said: 'There's a table out there in the next office covered with uniforms. Why don't you pick out the colors you like?' I went out. My wife was with me. We saw this Honolulu blue and silver and we fell in love with it."

Presnell remained with the Lions from 1934 to 1936.  He combined with Dutch Clark, Ace Gutowsky, and Ernie Caddel to lead the Lions to a second-place finish in 1934.  And in 1935, the same group led the Lions to their first NFL championship, culminating with a 26-7 victory over the New York Giants in the 1935 NFL Championship Game.  Presnell also set an NFL record with a 54-yard field goal in 1934, a mark that was not broken until 1953.

Coaching and later years
Presnell retired as a player after the 1936 season at age 31.  He worked as an assistant football coach at the University of Kansas in 1937 and then as the backfield coach at Nebraska from 1938 to 1941.  In February 1942, he became the head football coach and athletic director at Nebraska.  The Cornhuskers compiled a record of 3-7 in Presnell's one season as head coach.

In December 1942, Presnell enlisted in the United States Navy.  In May 1943, he was commissioned as a lieutenant and assigned to the Navy's physical education training program. In 1944 Presnell served as backs coach at the North Carolina Pre-Flight School. He spent three years in the Navy.

In 1954, Presnell returned to coaching as the head football coach for Eastern Kentucky University. He held that position from 1954 to 1963.  He was then athletic director at Eastern Kentucky until his retirement in 1971.

Presnell died in September 2004 in Ironton, Ohio at the age of 99.  He had been the last surviving member of the Detroit Lions' inaugural 1934 team.

Head coaching record

Awards
 Member of Nebraska Hall of Fame (1973).
 Professional Football Researchers Association Hall of Very Good Class of 2007

References

External links
 Nebraska profile
 
 

1905 births
2004 deaths
American football halfbacks
Detroit Lions players
Eastern Kentucky Colonels athletic directors
Eastern Kentucky Colonels football coaches
Kansas Jayhawks football coaches
Nebraska Cornhuskers football coaches
Nebraska Cornhuskers football players
Nebraska Cornhuskers athletic directors
North Carolina Pre-Flight Cloudbusters football coaches
Portsmouth Spartans players
Ironton Tanks players
United States Navy officers
United States Navy personnel of World War II
People from Thayer County, Nebraska
Coaches of American football from Nebraska
Players of American football from Nebraska